Saint-Martin-d'Ablois is a commune in the Marne département in north-eastern France.

See also
Communes of the Marne department

References

Saintmartindablois